Enoggera Road is a major road in Brisbane, Queensland, Australia. It is the main access road that connects the north-west Brisbane suburbs to Enoggera Creek towards the inner suburbs and the Brisbane CBD.

The road is commonly used by commuters travelling to and from outskirt suburbs such as Mitchelton, Ferny Grove and Samford.

Major intersections
The entire road is in the Brisbane local government area.

Amenities
Enoggera Road is home to the Newmarket Village Shopping Centre, which includes the Reading Cinema complex, one of the first north-side Brisbane McDonald's located at Newmarket and the Newmarket public pool located at Alderley.

See also

 Road transport in Brisbane

References

Roads in Brisbane